The culture of Croatia has roots in a long history: the Croatian people have been inhabiting the area for fourteen centuries. Linguistic anthropological evidence suggests Croats originated from [North Iran]. There are important remnants of the earlier periods still preserved in the country of Croatia with long continuity of urban settlements especially in Dalmatia. Because of its geographic position, Croatia represents a blend of different cultural circles that meet, intertwine and complement, a crossroad of influences of the western culture and the east—ever since division of the Western Roman Empire and the Byzantine Empire—as well as of the Mitteleuropa and the Mediterranean culture with more cities than in any other parts.

The Illyrian movement was the most significant period of national cultural history, as the 19th-century period proved crucial in emancipation of Croatians and saw unprecedented developments in all fields of art and culture, giving rise to a number of historical figures. Most notably, Croatia has a place in the history of Mediterranean architecture and urbanism, as well as clothing as the origin of the cravat, a precursor of the modern necktie. 

Modern and contemporary arts, music, urban, independent and youth culture in Croatia has been exceptionally growing with numerous festivals and frequent manifestations (especially until Covid-19 pandemic), but also (re-)emergence of new cultural infrastructure all over Croatia.

Ancient heritage 
Ancient monuments from the Paleolithic era consist of simple stone and bone objects. Some of the earliest remaining historical features include 100,000-year-old bones of a Neandertal man near Krapina, Hrvatsko Zagorje.

The most interesting Copper Age or Eneolithic finds are from Vučedol culture. Out of that culture sprung out Bronze Age Vinkovci culture (named after the city of Vinkovci) that is recognizable by bronze fibulas that were replacing objects like needles and buttons.

Bronze Age culture of Illyrians, ethnic group with distinct culture and art form started to organize itself in 7th century BC. Numerous monumental sculptures are preserved, as well as walls of citadel, Nezakcij near Pula, one of numerous Istrian cities from Iron Age.

Greeks from Syracuse in Sicily in 390 BC came to the islands of Vis (Issa), Hvar (Pharos), and Korčula (Corcyra Nigra), and there have founded city-states in which they lived quite isolated.
While the Greek colonies were flourishing on the island, on the continent the Illyrians were organizing their centers. Their art was greatly influenced by Greek art, and they have even copied some. Illyrians even conquered Greek colonies on Dalmatian islands. Famous was the queen Teuta of Issa (today island of Vis) which waged wars with the Romans. But finally, Rome subdued the Illyrians in the 1st century, cesar and after that the history of these parts is a history of Illyrian provinces of Rome and Byzantium.

The Romans organized the entire coastal territory by transforming citadels to urban cities. There have been at least thirty cities in Istria, Liburnia and Dalmatia with Roman citizenship (civitas). The best-preserved networks of Roman streets (decumanus/cardo) are those in Epetion (Poreč) and Jader (Zadar). The best preserved Roman monuments are in Pola (Pula) including an Amphitheater (an arena) from the 2nd century.

In the 3rd century AD, the city of Salona was the largest (with 40,000 inhabitants) and most important city of Dalmatia. Near the city, emperor Diocletian, born in Salona, built Diocletian's Palace (around year 300 AD), which is the largest and most important monument of late antique architecture in the World. In the 4th century, Salona became the center of Christianity for entire western Balkans. It hade numerous basilicas and necropolises, and even two saints: Domnius (Duje) and Anastasius (Staš).

One of few preserved basilicas in western Europe (beside ones in Ravenna) from the time of early Byzantium is Euphrasian Basilica in Poreč from the 6th century.

Medieval heritage 

The early Middle Ages brought the great migration of the Slavs and this period was perhaps a Dark Age in the cultural sense until the successful formation of the Slavic states which coexisted with Italic cities that remained on the coast, each of them were modelled like Venice.

In the 7th century the Croats, along with other Slavs and Avars, migrated from Eastern Europe to the area of Dalmatian hinterland. Here, the Croats came into contact with Roman art, culture, and most of all with Christianity. In first few centuries following their arrival, Croats adopted Christianity, which had spread from old Roman cities in Dalmatia and as well as by Frankish missionaries. In following centuries both Latin language, Church Slavonic and Glagolitic script were in use in Church liturgy among Croats, while pre-Romanesque period is considered foundational period of Croatian medieval culture. The monuments created in this period are associated with arrival of Benedictine monks to Croatia, who first came from Frankish monaesteries and subsequently from Monte Cassino. In later periods, the new monaesteries were mostly founded by local monks. The first benedictine monaestery in Dalmatia was constructed during the reign of 9th century duke Trpimir in Rižinice between modern day Solin and Klis. 

In later period the rule of duke Branimir, in particular, is considered as a time of "cultural blossom" of Croatia due to construction of new churches, reconstruction of already existing churches, as well as five stone inscriptions mentioning Branimir's name which remain preserved until this day. 

In second half of 10th century, Croatian queen Helen of Zadar, built a royal mausoleum in church of St. Stephen on the Island in what is today Solin. 

Another period of cultural blossom of Croatian kingdom came with the rule of 11th century king Demetruis Zvonimir. Since his rule was reletively stable, he donated many churches and monaesteries. The most famous of his donations is recorded in Baška Tablet, 11th century inscription written in Glagolitic script and Croatian language. It was discovered in village of Baška, on the island of Krk. It represents the earliest mention of Croatian royal name and royal title in Croatian language (Zvonimir, kralj hrvatski) for which it has a great significance in study of Croatian language.

Fine arts

Sculpture
The altar enclosure and windows of early medieval churches were highly decorated with a transparent shallow string-like ornament that is called Croatian interlace because the strings were threaded and rethreaded through themselves. Sometimes the engravings in early Croatian script–Glagolitic appear. Soon, the Glagolitic writings were replaced with Latin ones on altar boundaries and architraves of old-Croatian churches.

In Croatian Romanesque sculpture, we have a transformation from decorative interlace relief (Croatian interlace) to figurative relief. The best examples of Romanesque sculpture are: the wooden doors of the Split cathedral made by Andrija Buvina (c. 1220) and the stone portal of the Trogir cathedral by the artisan Radovan (c. 1240).
Zadar was an independent Venetian city. The most beautiful examples of Gothic humanism in Zadar represent reliefs in gilded metal on Chest of St Simeon, made by artisans from Milan in around 1380.

Most Croatian prominent sculptors of modern include Ivan Meštrović, Antun Augustinčić, Frano Kršinić and others.

Painting
Gothic painting is less well-preserved, and the finest works are in Istria such as the fresco-cycle of Vincent from Kastav in the Church of Holy Mary in Škriljinah near Beram, from 1474. From that time are two of the best and most decorated illuminated liturgical books made by monks from Split, Hvals’ Zbornik (today in Zagreb) and the Missal of the Bosnian Duke Hrvoje Vukčić Hrvatinić (now in Istanbul).

The most prominent painter from Croatia was Federiko Benković who worked almost his entire life in Italy, while an Italian, Francesco Robba, did the best Baroque sculptures in Croatia.

In Austrian countries at the beginning of the 19th century the Romantic movement in Croatia was sentimental, gentle and subtle.  Vlaho Bukovac brought the spirit of impressionism from Paris, and he strongly influenced the young artists (including the authors of "Golden Hall"). On the Millennium Exhibition in Budapest they were able to set aside all other artistic options in Austro-Hungary.

Modern art in Croatia began with the Secession ideas spreading from Vienna and Munich, and post-Impressionism from Paris. Young artists would study the latest trends and integrate them into their own work. Many strove to bring a native cultural identity into their art, for example themes of national history and legends, and some of the artwork following the First World War contained a strong political message against the ruling Austro-Hungarian state. A change was noticeable in 1919 with a move to flatter forms, and signs of cubism and expressionism were evident. In the 1920s, the Earth Group sought to reflect reality and social issues in their art, a movement that also saw the development of naive art. By the 1930s there was a return to more simple, classical styles.
Following the Second World War, artists everywhere were searching for meaning and identity, leading to abstract expressionism in the U.S. and art informel in Europe. In the new Yugoslavia, the communist socialist realism style never took hold, but bauhaus ideas led to geometric abstraction in paintings and simplified spaces in architecture. In the 1960s, non-conventional forms of visual expression took hold along with a more analytical approach to art, and a move towards new media, such as photography, video, computer art, performance art and installations, focusing more on the artists' process. Art of the 1970s was more conceptual, figurative and expressionist. However, the 1980s brought a return to more traditional painting and images.

Architecture

The oldest preserved examples of architecture in Croatia are the 9th century churches, with the largest and the most representative among them being Donatus of Zadar and Church of Holy Trinity, Split. Some of the first churches build by the Croats were royal sanctuaries, and the influences of Roman art were the strongest in Dalmatia where urbanization was most dense, and there were the largest number of monuments.
Along the coast, the architecture is Mediterranean with a strong influence of renaissance architecture in major urban areas best exemplified in works of Venetian Giorgio da Sebenico and Niccolò di Giovanni Fiorentino. 
Architecture in Croatia reflects influences of bordering nations. Austrian and Hungarian influence is visible in public spaces and buildings in the north and in the central regions. Large squares named after culture heroes, well-groomed parks, and pedestrian-only zones, are features of these orderly towns and cities, especially where large scale Baroque urban planning took place, for instance in Varaždin and Karlovac. Subsequent influence of the Art Nouveau was reflected in contemporary architecture.

Music and Performing arts

Music

Music in Croatia has two major influences: Central European, present in the central and northern parts of the country including Slavonia, and Mediterranean, particularly present in the coastal regions of Dalmatia and Istria.

In Croatia, both pop and rock are popular, and often incorporates Dalmatian or Slavonian folk elements. Since the mid-20th century, schlagers and chanson-inspired music have formed the backbone of the Croatian popular music. In recent times, the most popular music genre (especially among young Croatians) became Turbo folk. 

Porin is Croatian music award, named after Vatroslav Lisinski's opera of the same name and inspired by an American Grammy award. It has been awarded each year since 1994. Croatian national television usually also organizes national song contest - Dora, whose winnter represents Croatia on Eurovision. The contest was named after Croatian composer Dora Pejačević.

Theatre

Croatian theatre dates back at least as far as the Middle Ages, with a combination of religious liturgical dramas, and secular performances of travelling entertainers. During the Renaissance, there was a flowering of dramatic writing and performances in Dalmatia, especially in Dubrovnik and on the island of Hvar. Notable playwrights of the time were Marin Držić and Hanibal Lucić.In other parts of Croatia, theatres started to appear in the late 18th, early 19th century in cities such as Split, Dubrovnik, Šibenik, Zadar, Osijek, Varaždin, Pula, Rijeka, and Zagreb. The development of a Croatian National Theatre evolved from Zagreb's first city theatre on St Mark's Square. Beginning in the 1860s, performances were increasingly written and given in Croatian.

Today, Croatia boasts a strong tradition of theatres and theatrical companies all round the country. Performances range from dramas and musicals for adults or children, youth theatre and puppet theatre. Croatia is also home to the world's oldest Theatre of the Blind. Festivals are held in several locations in the summer.

Literature

Media

Cinema

Television

Television in Croatia was first introduced in 1956. As of 2012 there are 10 nationwide and 21 regional DVB-T (Digital Video Broadcasting – Terrestrial) television channels, and more than 30 other channels either produced in the Republic of Croatia or produced for the Croatian market and broadcast via IPTV (Internet Protocol television), cable or satellite television. The electronic communications market in Croatia is regulated by the Croatian Regulatory Authority for Network Industries (HAKOM), which issues broadcast licenses and monitors the market. The DVB-T and satellite transmission infrastructure is developed and maintained by the state-owned company Odašiljači i veze (OiV).

The first television signal broadcast in Croatia occurred in 1939 during the Zagreb Fair, where Philips showcased its television system. The first regular broadcasts started in 1956, when Television Zagreb was established as the first TV station in the Yugoslav Radio Television system. Color broadcasts began in 1972. Coverage and number of channels grew steadily, and by the 2000s there were four channels with nationwide coverage in Croatia. DVB-T signal broadcasts began in 2002, and in 2010 a full digital switchover was completed. During that period the IPTV, cable and satellite television markets grew considerably, and by 2011 only 60.7 percent of households received DVB-T television only; the remainder were subscribed to IPTV, cable and satellite TV in addition, or as the sole source of TV reception. As of January 2012 DVB-T is broadcast in three multiplexes, while the territory of Croatia is divided into nine main allotment regions and smaller local allotments corresponding to major cities. High-definition television (HDTV) is broadcast only through IPTV, although HDTV DVB-T test programming was broadcast from 2007 to 2011. A DVB-T2 test broadcast was conducted in 2011.

As of November 2019 all national channels are transmitted via three DVB-T and one DVB-T2 (HEVC/H.265) MUXes. After June 2020 DVB-T MUXes will be switched off and all channels will be distributed via two DVB-T2 (HEVC/H.265) MUXes.

Television in Croatia, as all other media in the country are criticised for lack of balance of global issues and trends on one hand and national topics covered on the other. All major television networks in Croatia are generally thought to be under excessive influence of commercialism. State owned Croatian Radiotelevision is required to produce and broadcast educational programmes, documentaries, and programmes aimed at the diaspora and national minorities in Croatia. The television in Croatia is considered to be important in avenue for non-governmental organizations communicating their concerns to the public and to criticising the authorities. Television is the primary source of information for 57% of the population of Croatia.

 Croatian radiotelevision

Radio

Croatian Radio is the official broadcasting service of Croatia. Founded on May 15, 1926 as Zagreb Radio, it was the first radio station in Southeast Europe, now part of Croatian Radiotelevision.

The broadcast, which began with just one channel that could be listened to only in Zagreb and northern Croatia, today makes 16 radio channels sent out on short wave, medium wave, FM, satellite and the Internet. 

On May 25, 2012, the television and radio program archive and a collection of music production were given the status of Croatia's cultural heritage.
 List of radio stations in Croatia
 List of Croatian language television channels

Education

People in Croatia enjoy free government-sponsored education at the primary and secondary level, and partially free university education. There are over 800 primary schools and over 400 secondary schools in the country.

The higher education is also government-sponsored, and mostly free for students who enroll with better results. There are thirty two various polytechnic schools, as well as seven universities in seven larger cities: Zagreb, Split, Rijeka, Osijek, Zadar, Dubrovnik, and Pula. Each of the universities in Croatia is composed of many independent "faculties" (Croatian fakultet, meaning college or department), which focus on specific areas of learning: Natural Sciences, Philosophy, Law, Engineering, Economy, Architecture, Medicine, and so on.

There are also a number of other educational and scientific institutions, such as institutes (most notably the Ruđer Bošković Institute) or the Croatian Academy of Sciences and Arts, a learned society promoting language, culture, and science from its first conception in 1866.

The Roman Catholic Church was instrumental in the founding of many educational facilities in Croatia. The Catholic Church in Croatia continues to maintain numerous seminaries and theological faculties in the country, as well as the Pontifical Croatian College of St. Jerome for Croatian students in Rome.

Places

The UNESCO has marked seven places in Croatia as World Heritage Sites:
 Episcopal complex of the Euphrasian Basilica in the historic center of Poreč
 The cathedral of St. James in Šibenik
 Historic city of Trogir
 Diocletian's Palace, built by Roman Emperor Diocletian
 Old city of Dubrovnik
 Plitvice Lakes
 Stari Grad Plain on the Adriatic island of Hvar, parceled by Ancient Greece

Regarding conservation and natural beauty, Croatia has eight national parks, mostly situated along the Adriatic coast.

Festivities and traditions
Some of the festivities held in Croatia include: 

 Sinjska alka - held in memory of victory Siege of Sinj in 1715
 Koprivnica Renaissance Festival
 Špancirfest in Varaždin
 Dubrovnik Summer Festival
 Đakovački vezovi 
 Vinkovačke jeseni
 Rijeka Carnival
 Samobor fašnik (Samobor Carnival)
 Rapska fjera
 Chivalry Tournament of Franjo Tahy in Donja Stubica (VIteški turnir Franje Tahija)
 Susreti za Rudija - the annual airshow in Gornja Stubica, held in memory of Rudolf Perešin
 Victory and Homeland Thanksgiving Day and the Day of Croatian Defenders
 Vukovar and Škabrnja Remembrance Day

Food and drink

Cuisine

Croatian cuisine is heterogeneous, and is therefore known as "the cuisine of regions". Its modern roots date back to proto-Slavic and ancient periods and the differences in the selection of foodstuffs and forms of cooking are most notable between those on the mainland and those in coastal regions. Mainland cuisine is more characterized by the earlier proto-Slavic and the more recent contacts with the more famous gastronomic orders of today, Hungarian, Viennese and Turkish, while the coastal region bears the influences of the Greek, Roman and Illyrian, as well as of the later Mediterranean cuisine, including Italian and French.

A large body of books bears witness to the high level of gastronomic culture in Croatia, which in European terms dealt with food in the distant past, such as the Gazophylacium by Belostenec, a Latin-Kajkavian dictionary dating from 1740 that preceded a similar French dictionary. There is also Beletristic literature by Marulić, Hektorović, Držić and other writers, down to the work written by Ivan Bierling in 1813 containing recipes for the preparation of 554 various dishes (translated from the German original), and which is considered to be the first Croatian cookbook.

Wine

Croatian wine (pl. ) has a history dating back to the Ancient Greek settlers, and their wine production on the southern Dalmatian islands of Vis, Hvar and Korčula some 2,500 years ago.< Like other old world wine producers, many traditional grape varieties still survive in Croatia, perfectly suited to their local wine hills. Modern wine-production methods have taken over in the larger wineries and EU-style wine regulations
 have been adopted, guaranteeing the quality of the wine.

There are currently over 300 geographically defined wine regions and a strict classification system to ensure quality and origin. The majority of Croatian wine is white, with most of the remainder being red and only a small percentage being rosé wines. In 2014, Croatia ranked 32nd in wine production by country with an estimated 45,272 tonnes.

Wine is a popular drink in Croatia, and locals traditionally like to drink wine with their meals.

Coffee Drinking Culture 

Drinking coffee is a ritual and a mean of socialising for Croatians. If they want to socialise with someone, they invite this person for a coffee. This is the reason why in Croatian towns, caffee bar terraces can always be seen crawling with locals drinking their cappucinoand hanging out. Unlike other countries where people tend to drink their coffee between 3 to 5 minutes long, average cofee drinking time among Croatians is between 40 and 45 minutes. According to the research done by Gfk Agency, 80% of Croatians older that 15 drink coffee on a daily basis. During the COVID-19 pandemic, 44% of Croatian citizens reported that they miss drinking their coffee in thair caffe bars. Among Dalmatians, 65% reported that first thing they will do when lockdown ends, is go to their caffee bar and order coffee. In Croatian culture, the person who invites for a coffee, usually pays the coffee. Exception is if a person wants to make a nice gesture, then this person pays.

Sports

Since independence Croatia has been a fairly successful sporting country. The most popular team sports have been association football (soccer). The Croatian Football Federation has more than 118,000 registered players, and it is the largest sporting association in the country. Since its existence, Croatian male national football team achieved notable results on worldwide scale by winning 3rd place in Fifa 1998 World Cup, 2nd place in Fifa 2018 World Cup and 3rd place in Fifa 2022 World Cup. 

Croatian male handball team also achieved some notable  successes by winning gold medal on summer Olympics in 1996 and 2004, gold medal on 2003 World Championship and silver medal on 2008, 2010 and 2020 European Championship. 

Other popular sports are basketball and to some extent water polo. The most popular sports played mainly by individuals are tennis, skiing, swimming, and to some extent table tennis and chess. The nation's arenas are primarily used for handball and basketball games. 

Some notable Croatian martial artists include Mirko "Cro Cop" Filipović, Željko Mavrović, Mate Parlov, Branko Cikatić, Ana Zaninović, Lucija Zaninović, Ivana Habazin and Maša Martinović.

See also

 Natural and Cultural Heritage of Croatia
 List of museums in Croatia

References

External links
 Republic of Croatia Ministry of Culture and Media
 Croatian Cultural Center of Greater Los Angeles

 Croatian Cultural 
 International Trust for Croatian Monuments
Heritage - digital collection of Croatian cultural heritage]
Arts and literature
 Prehistory art in Croatia
 Antiquity in Croatia
 Croatian Culture Links
 Preromanesque art of coastal Croatia
 Croatia Arts and Literature
 Croatian cultural heritage
 Online library of major Croatian literary works from Renaissance to Modernism. In Croatian only
Education
 Ministry of Science: the list of institutes and general survey
 Higher Education: Complete directory of higher education institutes in Croatia
History
 Museum of Croatian Archaeological Monuments home page
 Institute for Ethnology and Folklore
 Lado National Folklore Ansamble
 The History of Necktie
Nature Protection
 State Institute for Nature Protection - Croatia